MacKenzie Theory was an Australian jazz rock group formed in September 1971 in Melbourne. Rob MacKenzie (lead guitar, ex-Leo & Friends, King Harvest, Great Men) and  Cleis Pearce (electric viola) were the mainstays. They recorded two albums, Out of the Blue (1973) and Bon Voyage (1974) for Mushroom Records before disbanding in May 1974. Out of the Blue peaked at No. 19 on Go-Set Australian Albums chart. In the 1990s, MacKenzie was a member of United States rock'n'roll revival act, Sha Na Na.

History
MacKenzie Theory was formed in Melbourne by lead guitarist, Rob MacKenzie, with bass guitarist Mike Leadabrand and drummer Andrew Majewski in September 1971. At this time MacKenzie also met electric viola player Cleis Pearce at a concert in Sydney, while he was filling in with another group, and he was so impressed with her playing that he immediately invited her to join, even though she had no previous experience of playing rock or improvised music. Previously, MacKenzie had been a member of Leo and Friends, and King Harvest. MacKenzie Theory played instrumental jazz rock with elements of John Coltrane, King Crimson, Mahavishnu Orchestra and Santana. At early gigs they supported other artists including, Band of Light, Billy Thorpe & the Aztecs, Chain, Madder Lake or Spectrum.

They performed at the inaugural Sunbury Pop Festival in January 1972 and at the second festival in January 1973. Their track, "New Song And", was included on the triple live album, The Great Australian Rock Festival Sunbury 1973 which appeared on Mushroom Records in April. Their debut album, Out of the Blue, recorded live in the studio, was issued in July, and it peaked at No. 19 on Go-Set Australian Albums chart in August. During September, Leadabrand and Majewski left and were replaced by Paul Wheeler (ex-Billy Thorpe & the Aztecs) on bass guitar and Greg Sheehan (ex-Blackfeather) on drums; pianist, Peter Jones joined.

MacKenzie Theory appeared at Sunbury again in 1974 and "Supreme Love" appeared on Highlights of Sunbury '74 Part 2. They disbanded by mid-year before MacKenzie and Pearce travelled to the United Kingdom, their final appearance on 15 May was recorded and released as a live album, Bon Voyage by Mushroom Records, although this was reportedly released against the wishes of Mackenzie, who felt that the performance captured on the album was below-par for the group. 

In the 1990s, MacKenzie was a member of United States rock'n'roll revival act, Sha Na Na. In December 2009, Aztec Music issued a remastered version of Out of the Blue on CD.

In the 1980s Cleis Pearce performed and recorded with the Sydney-based jazz ensemble Women & Children First, led by saxophonist Sandy Evans. Pearce now lives, composes, teaches and makes art in the Byron Bay area of NSW and has been an artist in residence with Southern Cross University.

Personnel
 Rob MacKenzie – guitar (9/1971–5/1974, ex-Leo & Friends, King Harvest, Great Men)
 Cleis Pearce – electric viola (9/1971–5/1974)
 Peter Jones – piano (9/1973–5/1974)
 Mike Leadabrand – bass guitar (9/1971–9/1973)
 Paul "Sheepdog" Wheeler – bass guitar (9/1973–5/1974)
 Andrew Majewski – drums (1971–9/1973)
 Greg Sheehan – drums (9/1973–5/1974)

Discography

Studio albums

References

General
  Note: Archived [on-line] copy has limited functionality.
  Note: [on-line] version of The Who's Who of Australian Rock was established at White Room Electronic Publishing Pty Ltd in 2007 and was expanded from the 2002 edition. As from, September 2010 the [on-line] version shows an 'Internal Service Error' and was no longer available.
Specific

External links 
 MacKenzie Theory biography, discography and album reviews, credits & releases at AllMusic
 MacKenzie Theory discography, album releases & credits at Discogs
 MacKenzie Theory biography, discography, album credits & user reviews at ProgArchives.com
 MacKenzie Theory albums to be listened on Spotify
 MacKenzie Theory albums to be listened on YouTube

Australian jazz ensembles
Musical groups established in 1971
Victoria (Australia) musical groups
Australian progressive rock groups